Aaron Dignan (born December 20, 1979) is an American businessman and writer.

Career
Dignan is the founder of The Ready, an org design company based in New York City, New York; and the former CEO of Undercurrent.

He is the author of Game Frame: Using Games as a Strategy for Success (Free Press, 2011).

Dignan sits for digital-advisory boards for General Electric, American Express and PepsiCo, as well as the board of directors for Smashburger.

References

Place of birth missing (living people)
1979 births
21st-century American non-fiction writers
21st-century American businesspeople
American male non-fiction writers
American corporate directors
Living people
21st-century American male writers